Football Club Brahmanbaria Women is a professional Bangladeshi Women's association football from Brahmanbaria. The club was founded on 2017 and currently plays in Bangladesh Women's Football League.

History
The club were founded 2017 and it participated 2020–21 Bangladesh Women's Football League season. The club has played inaugural match against Jamalpur Kacharipara Akadas on 1 April 2021 and  grabbed victory 0–1 goal.

Current squad

FC Brahmanbaria Women squad for 2021–22 season.

Competitive record

Club management

Current technical staff

Board of Directors
As of January 2023

Head coach records

See also 
 Bashundhara Kings Women
 Nasrin Sporting Club
 ARB College Sporting Club
 Jamalpur Kacharipara Akadas
 Bangladesh Women's Football League

References

External links
    FC Brahmanbaria on facebook
  FC Brahmanbaria on Instagram

2017 establishments in Bangladesh
Association football clubs established in 2017
Women's football clubs in Bangladesh